Microshock refers to the risk that patients undergoing medical procedures involving externally protruding intracardiac electrical conductors, such as external pacemaker  electrodes, or saline filled catheters, could suffer an electric shock causing ventricular fibrillation (VF) due to currents entering the body via these parts.

Some definitions related to micro-shock

It is important to note that microshock (or micro-shock) are not IEV defined terms and are not used in any international standard.

"Micro-shock" is an otherwise imperceptible electric current applied directly, or in very close proximity, to the heart muscle of sufficient strength, frequency, and duration to cause disruption of normal cardiac function.

Note: It can be safely assumed (and it usually is) that micro-shock is only possible during certain medical procedures as the electric current needs to be focused directly into the heart by some conductor inserted by invasive means for some desired medical outcome (for example Cardiac Catheterisation).

Micro-shock, if it occurs, is not always lethal. “Micro-electrocution” is the term that should be used whenever a micro-shock causes death.

“Macro-shock” is when a much larger current is passed through the body, usually via a skin to skin pathway, but more generally the current is not applied directly through the heart muscle. The current in macro-shock events can vary widely from being imperceptible to being extremely destructive of tissue. (see Macroshock)

“Electric Shock” is usually referring to macro-shock. (see Electric Shock)

“Electrocution” is usually referring to a macro-shock that has caused prolonged or severe disruption of normal cardiac function - ultimately leading to death. (see Electrocution)

Theory
Microschock requires direct electrical connection to the heart muscle and is normally illustrated using a diagram such as Figure 1 (from TGE).

(an image is to be uploaded here shortly)

In this scenario the patient has inadvertently contacted both a source of current (it does not have to be AC, as shown) as well as a common return pathway during an invasive cardiac medical procedure. If the current flowing is below the threshold of perception, or the patient is sedated, or anaesthetized, there may be no pain or reflex response of either arm. If the current flow continues for sufficient time, at sufficient strength, the patient may die. Because of the low current and lack of patient response, this death may be unexpected, and without any obvious cause. In practice, however, this has never been proven to have happened.

To a novice, however, this scenario looks incredibly dangerous, and it is therefore worth examining in some detail.

Firstly, let’s follow the current path. There is a generic source of current. This source can be either large or small, as only a small voltage is required to drive the low current for micro-shock. Such sources might be, a wall socket, a faulty item of equipment, an inappropriate item of equipment, a poorly designed item of equipment, or an item of equipment designed to deliver current into the body. Our patient has unfortunately contacted one such source and current is dispersing through their right arm and upper torso, to eventually converge on a catheter (as labelled – but it could be a lead or wire) that is placed into their heart. This concentration of current flow at the heart muscle is the danger from micro-shock.  If the catheter is conductive and insulated, the current may follow the catheter, emerging through the skin into some other item of equipment. For the circuit as shown to be complete, the conductive part of the catheter needs to also be connected to ground within this equipment. Finally, the hazardous circuit is complete – current can flow and if it continues the patient is in mortal danger. Again, while this is theoretically possible this has never been proven to have actually happened.

So, why is this situation not arisen? The details are explored below but the basic presumptions that a patient will simultaneously contact the mains, with a catheter inserted, using equipment that grounds the catheter, is very, very unlikely. Also most electrical connections made in or around a patients heart will be those of medical electrical equipment. Medical electrical equipment, which have such applied parts, are constructed to strict standards that limit the allowable currents flowing via such connections (applied parts). This ensures the safety of the patient.

History
There has never been a documented case of microshock. A U.S. Senate inquiry in the early 1970s, sparked by exaggerated reports of thousands of U.S hospital patients dying of microshock, heard expert testimony about the effect. A review of the evidence in the early 2000s found that not a single case had been reported in the 30 years since the Senate inquiry. Regular checks of the FDA's MAUDE database also show no evidence of this risk being manifest, before or since the review.

Based on studies with dogs by Prof Leslie Geddes in the middle of last century, it is theorised that a current as low as 10 μA (microampere) directly through the heart, may send a human patient directly into ventricular fibrillation. Of course, the exact outcome is dependent on the duration of the current, the exact position of contact, the frequency of current oscillation, and the timing of the shock with the hearts rhythm e.g R on T phenomenon. It is feared that such a small current may be introduced unwittingly, and unobserved, creating a very perilous situation for the patient. To guard against this slim theoretical possibility then, modern medical devices include a range of protective measures to limit current in cardiac-connected circuits to the assumed safe levels of below 10 μA (microampere) . These measures include isolated patient connections, high impedance connections and current limiting circuits. Despite the in-built protections, and lack of observed incidents, microshock continues to be a concern to many practitioners of the fields of Biomedical and Clinical Engineering.

Despite the evidence of decades of absence of reports, in any condition where electrical conductors are run into the body in proximity of the heart (i.e. cardiac catheterizations) precautions are still taken to ensure hazardous current is not introduced through these conductors and it is still regarded as a high risk activity.

See also
Macroshock
Electric Shock

Notes

References
Gross J (2005) Less Jolts from Your Volts: Electrical Safety in the Operating Room. ASA Refresher Courses in Anesthesiology. 33(1):101-114
Ridgway M The Great Debate on Electrical Safety  - in Retrospect in Clinical Engineering Handbook, 1st Edition, Chapter 65, J Dyro (ed) Academic Press 2004
O'Meley P L Who's Afraid of Microshock - presentation to SMBE NSW Conference, Albury NSW, 2011
Hsu J The Hypertextbook http://hypertextbook.com/facts/2000/JackHsu.shtml accessed 23 July 2013
FDA MAUDE Database http://www.accessdata.fda.gov/scripts/cdrh/cfdocs/cfmaude/TextSearch.cfm accessed 25 July 2013
Road Safety Report http://roadsafety.transport.nsw.gov.au/downloads/fatality_rate_1908_to_2009.pdf accessed 25 July 2013
IEV Electropedia produced by the International Electrotechnical Commission (IEC) http://www.electropedia.org
IEC/TS 60479-1 - Effects of current on human beings and livestock https://webstore.iec.ch/publication/25402

Biomedical engineering
Cardiac electrophysiology